Tha It is a tambon (sub-district) of Mueang Uttaradit District, in Uttaradit Province, Thailand. In 2005 it had a population of 34,500 people. The sub-district covers the same area as the town of Uttaradit.

References

Tambon of Uttaradit province
Populated places in Uttaradit province